Dromore Central Primary School (colloquially referred to as "the Central") is a primary school located in Dromore, County Down, Northern Ireland. The original school building was built in 1938 and has approximately 600 pupils aged from 4–11 years in 29 classes. The schools aims "to promote the all-round development of every pupil". It is within the Southern Education and Library Board area.

The school is situated on the main Dromore to Banbridge road, only 300 yards from the Market Square.
Since 2001, the compulsory school uniform has consisted of a green pullover, a red polo-shirt and grey trousers, this replaced a brown-yellow uniform which had been worn since the 1970s.

History
The school, as it stands today and will hopefully be re used, was established in 1938 by the Down Education Authority, to replace the former Church of Ireland (Cathedral) School, which it neighboured, and the First Dromore Presbyterian Church School, as well as the Unitarian or Hunters' School. The school was extended to provide an extra block of classrooms and a dining hall with kitchen in 1979. Since, the school has seen the addition of mobile classrooms to help cope with the rising rolls. Prior to its present title, the school had been known as Dromore Public Elementary School, or simply the P.E. school.

New Building
In August 2006, the Southern Education and Library Board announced it was 'pursuing' the acquisition of a site at Mossvale Road in Dromore, for a replacement school for the over-stretched Dromore Central Primary School although for reasons rumoured to involve the site, no location has been officially selected to date. On 30 June 2007, the Tullymacarette Primary School sited 3 miles southwest of the town closed with all  of its pupils being fed into Dromore Central, with the exception of those who desired to go to another school.  The Dromore Town Centre Development Plan suggests that the existing site could be developed into a community centre or a hotel.

References 
Dromore Central Primary School Official Website
GCS Dromore Pages
"New Home Agreed for School" - Lisburn Today
Schools Web Directory
House of Lords Hansard, November 2005

See also 
List of primary schools in Northern Ireland

Primary schools in County Down
Educational institutions established in 1938
1938 establishments in Northern Ireland